My Little Pony (MLP) is a toy line and media franchise developed by American toy company Hasbro. The first toys were developed by Bonnie Zacherle, Charles Muenchinger, and Steve D'Aguanno, and were produced in 1981. The ponies feature colorful bodies, manes and a unique symbol on one or both sides of their flanks. Such symbols are referred to in the three most recent incarnations as "cutie marks". My Little Pony has been revamped several times with new and more modern looks to continue its appeal to the market, with each new look called a "generation" by the show's collectors and fans. The franchise is mainly targeted at young girls, although in the 2010s, it gained a cult following by an unintended audience of adult, mostly male fans.

Following the original My Pretty Pony toy that was introduced in 1981, My Little Pony was launched in 1982 and the line became popular during the 1980s. The original toy line ran from 1982 to 1992 in the United States and to 1995 globally, and two animated specials, an animated feature-length film and two animated television series produced during the period up until 1992. The first incarnation's popularity peaked in 1990, but the following year Hasbro decided to discontinue the toy line due to increased competition. One hundred fifty million ponies were sold in the 1980s.

The toy line was revived in 1997, but these toys proved unpopular and were discontinued in 1999. The brand saw a more popular revival in 2003 with toys that more closely resembled the original toy line, which sold approximately 100 million pony toys globally by 2010. Hasbro launched the fourth incarnation of the franchise in 2010, which started with the animated series My Little Pony: Friendship Is Magic, which ended on October 12, 2019. The brand grossed over million in retail sales in 2013, and over billion annually in retail sales in 2014 and 2015. Hasbro launched a fifth generation of toys and associated media starting September 24, 2021.

History

My Pretty Pony (1981)

My Pretty Pony is a pony figurine introduced by Hasbro in 1981 that was created by illustrator Bonnie Zacherle and sculptor Charles Muenchinger. My Pretty Pony is a ten-inch-tall hard plastic figurine that can wiggle its ears, swish its tail, and wink one eye. The original My Pretty Pony was followed by My Pretty Pony and Beautiful Baby, which came with an additional smaller "baby" pony figure. This was followed by pink and yellow versions of the original that have the now-hallmark symbol on the ponies' backsides, which preceded the My Little Pony figurines.

1982–1992

After the relative lack of success of the My Pretty Pony toy line, Hasbro introduced six smaller and colorful versions of the toy in 1982, sold under the title My Little Pony. The toy line led to many more merchandise under the My Little Pony brand, which later became unofficially known as the "Generation One" or "G1" of My Little Pony among collectors. This incarnation ended in 1992 in the United States, but was marketed internationally until 1995. Animations from mid-1980s (My Little Pony animated special, My Little Pony: Escape from Catrina, My Little Pony: The Movie and My Little Pony segment within My Little Pony 'n Friends anthology series) and My Little Pony Tales from 1992 accompanied the line-up.

1997–1999

The 1997 incarnation was marketed by Hasbro as "Friendship Garden" and designated "Generation 2" by collectors. They were manufactured in redesigned poses with jewel eyes and turning heads and are smaller, slimmer, and longer-legged than their 1982 counterparts. The line was not successful in the U.S. and was discontinued in 1999, although it continued overseas for several years. Since the second generation was more popular in Western Europe, Hasbro continued to produce and sell them in Western Europe after 1998. Most were Earth Ponies, but a few unicorns were made internationally. Although no Pegasus Ponies were made, some adults had clip-on wings. In the early 2000s, several unicorns with clip-on wings (called the Magic Unicorns) were made. Two baby ponies were introduced, and none of the baby ponies were sold in the United States.

In Europe, the main location was renamed Ponyland instead of Friendship Gardens, and were discontinued with the inception of the "G3" toyline in 2003. Many ponies released in the last years of the line are considered rare. A number of playsets were introduced, including a mansion and a castle. Some of the licensed merchandise released in Europe included beanbag plushes, magazines, clothing, perfume, wrapping paper and coloring books. A CD-ROM game for PC, Friendship Gardens, was also released, which involved taking care of a pony and playing games along the way.

Some "Generation Two" ponies were sold as detachable key chains, including Morning Glory, Sundance, Light Heart and Ivy. Each pony comes with a comb attached to her neck by a string. The back of the package says, "My Little Pony Logo and Pony Names are Trademarks of Hasbro Inc. Copyright 1998." They were produced under license by Fun-4-All Corporation and made in China.

My Little Pony: Friendship Gardens (1998)
My Little Pony: Friendship Gardens is a virtual pet game developed by Artech Studios and published by Hasbro Interactive.

2003–2009

The third incarnation of My Little Pony, which is often unofficially referred to as "Generation Three" or "G3" by collectors, began in 2003. The revamped line of dolls was targeted to a younger audience than the previous lines. Before the generation's end in 2009, there were at least two minor revamps. A series of direct-to-video animated films (mostly produced by SD Entertainment) accompanied the line-up.

2010–2021

The next incarnation of My Little Pony, unofficially known as the "Generation Four", was launched in 2010. It is set in a fictional location named Equestria, and the main characters include Twilight Sparkle, Spike, Rainbow Dash, Pinkie Pie, Applejack, Rarity and Fluttershy. Television series My Little Pony: Friendship Is Magic, theatrical film My Little Pony: The Movie, as well as other related media accompany the current line-up. This era generated a fandom among grown-ups with the success of the television series.

My Little Pony: Equestria Girls, the anthropomorphic spin-off, was launched in 2013.

My Little Pony: Pony Life, a spin-off comedy series, launched  in 2020 featuring a new, chibi animation style.

2021–present

Hasbro announced the start of the current "Generation Five" toyline in February 2021, with a 3D CG-animated film (produced by Entertainment One and animated by Boulder Media) and a follow-up television series. Unlike previous generation changes which have generally featured a completely new set of characters, Generation Five will build upon the world and stories established in Generation Four from Friendship Is Magic, but will include a time jump as to introduce new characters and themes. According to Hasbro's Emily Thompson, vice president of global brand management for Entertainment One, the new line is aimed at Generation Alpha, which "has a higher emotional intelligence, and they expect a lot more from their entertainment"; to that end, the themes of the show will be aimed around diversity and inclusion but will still include nods and Easter eggs to the prior generation.

The film and series takes place sometime after the end of Friendship Is Magic, where "friendship and harmony have been replaced by paranoia and mistrust" and the various pony species have segregated into their own tribes. The main characters of Generation Five includes Sunny Starscout (a female earth pony), Izzy Moonbow (a female unicorn) and Hitch Trailblazer, (a male earth pony), alongside Pegasus siblings Pipp Petals and Zipp Storm.

The film was originally slated for theatrical release by Paramount Pictures, but the release was canceled due to the COVID-19 pandemic. It was sold to Netflix, with the film's release date being set on September 24, 2021. Netflix also greenlit its follow-up CG-animated series, which will also debut on the streaming service. During Hasbro's Investor Event in February 2021, Entertainment One president of family brands, Olivier Dumont, announced that a 44-minute special was also in the works for Netflix.

The film was succeeded by a special and streaming television series titled My Little Pony: Make Your Mark in May and September 2022 respectively, and a Christmas-themed special, titled My Little Pony: Winter Wishday in November, on Netflix. A YouTube exclusive series titled My Little Pony: Tell Your Tale premiered in April 2022.

Television series & Films

Adult fans

Collectors
My Little Pony toys drew the attention of collectors from their initial release. Media coverage in the 2000s reported on collectors' conventions, finding it odd that adult women are interested in My Little Pony. The 2004 My Little Pony Collectors' Convention reportedly had only one man among the attendees. When updating the toy line, Hasbro reassured collectors that it will produce My Little Pony editions for collectors.

Friendship Is Magic fandom

Despite Hasbro's target demographic of young girls and their parents, the fourth incarnation of the franchise became a cultural and Internet phenomenon as the My Little Pony: Friendship Is Magic television series generated an unexpected fandom, with many male fans between 13 and 35 creating a large fanbase and a multitude of creative works, fan sites, and conventions. The fanbase has adopted the name "brony", a blend of "bro" and "pony", to describe themselves. The older fanbase had come as a surprise to Hasbro and staff members involved with the show. They have appreciated and embraced the fandom, adding nods to the fans within the show and the toys. Sherilyn Connelly and others have noted that bronies alienate other fans of the franchise by focusing on the fandom itself rather than the show.

Social impact

Consumerism
My Little Pony is often derided for promoting consumerism. When the media adaptations of the franchise debuted, there was much controversy in the United States about television advertising targeted at children. Relaxed regulation in the 1980s on cross-referencing between programming and commercials led to toy-based shows, such as Mattel's He-Man and the Masters of the Universe, Hasbro's Transformers, G. I. Joe, and later My Little Pony 'n' Friends. While He-Man initially drew the most controversy, My Little Pony remained controversial for many decades later, even when it was not being produced; the criticism is much more harsh and enduring than similar franchises with toy lines. Sherilyn Connelly cites examples from authors and journalists who single out My Little Pony for being tied to toys and merchandise, often putting it "first against the wall"  while sparing such criticism from the aforementioned Hasbro franchises, or franchises such as Star Wars, Toy Story, and Lego. Connelly notes that professionals who work with children, for example psychologists and librarians, often have a positive view on the franchise; psychologist John Rosemond described My Little Pony toys as "great, soothing, quiet-time toys", having none of the violence or sexuality of other toy franchises. The first animated series is often given as the worst example of a Saturday-morning cartoon, despite never airing on Saturday mornings. Even though no My Little Pony adaptation was airing on television for much of the 1990s and no toys were being produced, it was still often brought up as a contemporary example of aggressive marketing through television.

Femininity
Connelly contends that My Little Pony is singled out not because the franchise's business methods or content standards are particularly different from other franchises', but because it is overtly girly. Replying to criticism that My Little Pony is "junk" while Star Wars stems from "integrity and creative vision", cartoonist Craig McCracken noted that both franchises can have integrity or be junk, depending on how they're produced. Character designer Chris Battle pointed out that the media adaptation of My Little Pony is seen as less valid because it is aimed at girls. Director Lauren Faust, who was creative developer of the relaunch of the My Little Pony franchise in 2010, wrote that she expected people who haven't even watched the animated series "to instantly label it girly, stupid, cheap, for babies or an evil corporate commercial." Faust feels that the show's femininity makes it a target of derision, regardless of its other qualities. Ellen Seiter, professor of media studies, observed that girl's television shows are a ghettoization of girl culture, and the attacks on these shows is often aimed at their femininity. My Little Pony has been perceived as an icon of femininity and "girlie-girls", particularly in the United Kingdom. The franchise has alternately been described as asexual and too sexual by the UK media.

Notes

References

Further reading
 
 Summer Hayes (May 1, 2008) The My Little Pony G1 Collector's Inventory: an unofficial full color illustrated collector's price guide to the first generation of MLP including all US ponies, playsets and accessories released before 1997 with a foreword by Dream Valley's Kim Shriner. Priced Nostalgia Press. 
 Summer Hayes (2007) The My Little Pony G3 Collector's Inventory: an unofficial full color illustrated guide to the third generation of MLP including all ponies, playsets and accessories from 2003 to the present. Priced Nostalgia Press. 
 Hillary DePiano (2005) The My Little Pony Collector's Inventory: A Complete Checklist of All US Ponies, Playsets and Accessories from 1981 to 1992. Priced Nostalgia Press. 
 Summer Hayes (2009) The My Little Pony 2007–2008 Collector's Inventory. Priced Nostalgia Press. 
 Debra L. Birge (2007) My Little Pony: Around the World. Schiffer Publishing.

External links
 

 
Fictional horses
1980s toys
1990s toys
2000s toys
2010s toys
2020s toys
Mass media franchises introduced in 1981
Toy brands
Doll brands
Toy animals
Talking animals in fiction
Hasbro brands
Hasbro franchises